is the double retrospective CD of Japanese actress/singer Hiroko Yakushimaru. It was released by EMI Music Japan in March 2011 to celebrate her 30-year career as a recording artist, with 30 of the songs that Yakushimaru herself selected.

This collection mainly consists of the efforts from her EMI era when Yakushimaru had enjoyed successful recording career, and also includes the single version of her biggest hit "Sailor Suit and Machine Gun"—the original take of the song had rarely appeared on her previous compilations, because it was the sole material that she released via Kitty Records. Disc one is closed with a new song "Boku no Takaramono" which she recorded for the first time in 12 years. It was featured on a film Wasao starring her, and also released as a single.

None of the works released by BMG Funhouse during the late 1990s was featured on the album. The works collaborated with her former spouse Koji Tamaki were also completely disregarded, including top-ten hit single "Mune no Furiko" in 1987.

Track listing

Chart positions

References

2011 greatest hits albums